The 1913 Fordham Maroon football team was an American football team that represented Fordham University as an independent during the 1913 college football season. In its second and final year under head coach Tom Thorp, Fordham claims an 18–9–2 record. College Football Data Warehouse (CFDW) lists the team's record at 3–3–2.

Schedule
The following eight games are reported in Fordham's media guide, CFDW, and contemporaneous press coverage.

The following are additional games reported in the Fordham media guide.

References

Fordham
Fordham Rams football seasons
Fordham Maroon football